Must is the juice made out of freshly pressed grapes.

Must or MUST may also refer to:

 Must (surname)
 Musth or must, a periodic physiological and behavioural change affecting bull elephants
 Julmust, a Swedish soft drink made out of extracts of hop and malt
 Must, one of the English modal verbs
 Must (album), a 2021 album by South Korean boy band 2PM
 Medical Unit, Self-contained, Transportable, a type of hospital equipment used by the United States Army c. 1960–1990

Organisations
 Macau University of Science and Technology, Macau, China
 Manchester United Supporters' Trust, the official supporters' trust of Manchester United F.C.
 Mazandaran University of Science and Technology, Babol, Mazandaran, Iran
 Mbarara University of Science and Technology, Mbarara, Uganda
 Mbeya University of Science and Technology, Tanzania
 Swedish Military Intelligence and Security Service (Militära underrättelse- och säkerhetstjänsten)
 Mindanao University of Science and Technology, Cagayan de Oro City, Philippines
 Minghsin University of Science and Technology, Hsinchu County, Taiwan
 Mirpur University of Science and Technology, Mirpur, Azad Kashmir, Pakistan
 Misr University for Science and Technology, Egypt
 Mongolian University of Science and Technology, Ulan Bator, Mongolia
 Missouri University of Science and Technology, United States
 Malaysia University of Science & Technology, Malaysia
 Malawi University of Science and Technology, Malawi

See also
 Most (disambiguation)
 Mustard (disambiguation)
 Muster (disambiguation)
 NUST (disambiguation)
 University of Science and Technology (disambiguation)